Incrucipulum is a genus of fungi within the Hyaloscyphaceae family. The genus contains 4 species.

References

External links
Incrucipulum at Index Fungorum

Hyaloscyphaceae